Peacey is a surname. Notable people with the surname include: 

Basil Peacey (1889–1969), British divine, Bishop of Lebombo
Jess Lawson Peacey (1885–1965), British sculptor
John Peacey (1896–1971), English cricketer

See also
Pacey